Mentque-Nortbécourt is a commune in the Pas-de-Calais department in the Hauts-de-France region of France.

Geography
Mentque-Nortbécourt lies about 8 miles (13 km) northwest of Saint-Omer, at the junction of the D221 and D220 roads. The two villages were joined as one commune in 1819.

Population

Places of interest
 The Nortbécourt or Lebriez windmill was built on limestone rubble foundations in 1714, according to an inscription on a stone inside the tower. In 1897, it became the property of Alphonse Lebriez, who was the miller until the cessation of activity in 1950. In 1964, Michel Hoyez bought the mill and saved it from ruin. It has been included in the inventory of Historic Monuments since 1977. The sails were rebuilt in December 1981 but remain fixed and cannot rotate. One of them was hit by lightning.

 The church of St. Wandrille at Nortbécourt, dating from the twelfth century.
 The Château of Inglinghen.
 The church of St.Leger at Mentque, dating from the thirteenth century.
 The remains of a feudal motte of 25m diameter.

See also
Communes of the Pas-de-Calais department

References

External links

 Regional Tourist Office website

Mentquenortbecourt